Taylors Creek is a  long 3rd order tributary to Caraway Creek, in Randolph County, North Carolina.

Course
Taylors Creek rises on the Back Creek divide about 1 mile southwest of Asheboro in Randolph County, North Carolina.  Taylors Creek then flows west to meet Caraway Creek about 0.5 miles northwest of Mechanic.

Watershed
Taylors Creek drains  of area, receives about 46.9 in/year of precipitation, has a topographic wetness index of 374.12 and is about 65% forested.

See also
List of rivers of North Carolina

References

Rivers of North Carolina
Rivers of Randolph County, North Carolina